The White Ship is a 1976 Soviet drama film directed by Bolotbek Shamshiyev. It was entered into the 26th Berlin International Film Festival.

Plot
In a primeval forest cut off from the rest of the world, a seven-year-old boy and six adults are living. The boy is isolated and lonesome. A connoisseur of folk tales, old Maumoon serves as a substitute for his parents. A world of tales and beautiful legends as perceived by the impressionable child prone to fantastic perception of reality, conflicts with the harsh existence of adults engrossed into their own problems.

Cast
 Nurgazy Sydygaliyev as Boy
 Sabira Kumushaliyeva as Grandma
 Orozbek Kutmanaliyev as Uncle Orozkul
 Aiturgan Temirova as Gyuldzhamal
 Asankul Kuttubayev as Momun

References

External links

1976 films
1976 drama films
1970s Russian-language films
Soviet drama films
Russian drama films
Films directed by Bolotbek Shamshiyev